Seebach is a river of Bavaria, Germany.

The Seebach is a left tributary of the Rhine–Main–Danube Canal, which is connected with the Regnitz. Before the canal was built, it was a direct tributary of the Regnitz.

See also
List of rivers of Bavaria

References

Rivers of Bavaria
Rivers of Germany